The Palos Forest Preserve, a division of the Forest Preserve District of Cook County, is a 15,000 acre nature reserve in Palos Township, Illinois.  The division headquarters are in Willow Springs.  The preserve features the Palos Trail System. This multi-trail system is the largest trail system in the forest preserve district. There are over 40 miles of unpaved trails and they all connect to each other by the many intersections.  The longest of these trails is labeled “Yellow Unpaved” with a 9.2 mile distance, and the shortest is labeled “Brown Unpaved” with a 1.1 mile distance. These trails are made for hiking, bicycle riding, horseback riding, and even skiing in the winter. There are sixteen entrances to the Palos Trail System which, along with the forest preserve system as a whole, is open from dawn to dusk every day.

In 2021, the Palos Preserves were designated an Urban Night Sky Place by the International Dark-Sky Association, the largest such Urban Night Sky Place designation in the world.

Popular sites in the Palos Forest Preserve

Camp Bullfrog Lake
This campground has year-round camping. It has campsites for tents, RV's, as well as large and small cabins. One needs to make a reservation in advance. They also offer kayak rentals for registered campers. It has a camp store and shower facilities.

Camp Kiwanis Equestrian Center
It's a place to rent horses for horseback riding near some of the trails.

Fishing Lakes
There are many lakes to fish at in the trail system. Saganashkee Slough is the largest one. Maple Lake, Bullfrog Lake, Tomahawk Slough, Long John Slough, and Horse Collar Slough, are some of the other larger ones.

Little Red Schoolhouse Nature Center
The building was a regular school from 1886 to 1948, and it became a learning center for children and adults starting in 1955.  It is now open year-round but closed on Fridays. At this center one can learn things about nature of the surrounding area, and as well as the plants and animals that live there.  Many schools have educational field trips at this nature center for free.  There are several walking trails that start at the Schoolhouse where kids can go exploring  along one of these trails, you can find a 6,000 square foot garden.

Maple Lake
At the Maple Lake Boating Center you can rent canoes, kayaks, and row boats. They are open from April until October 6 days a week while being closed only on Tuesdays. It also has an overlook area for scenic viewing as well as a mountain bike staging area.

Picnic Groves
There are many wooded areas that have picnic tables with and without shelters. You need to make reservations in advance and get a permit in order to hold parties. The locations all vary in size and can hold up to several hundred people.

 Buffalo Woods
 Country Lane Woods
 Hidden Pond East
 Pioneer Woods
 Pulaski Woods
 Spears Woods
 Willow Springs Woods
 Wolf Road Woods

Red Gate Woods

Red Gate Woods is the burial place of Chicago Pile-1, the world's first nuclear reactor.  Constructed as part of the Manhattan Project, in 1943 the reactor was transferred  from the University of Chicago to the Forest Preserve District for further experimental work. Historical markers at the Plot M disposal site indicate where the remains of the reactor are buried.

Saganashkee Slough

It is a 377-acre man-made lake. At its largest depth it is 6.3 feet deep. It has 3 entrances: East, Central, and a boat launch entrance if you want to bring your own boat. Starting at the East entrance, there is a path used for hiking along the southern part of the lake, and it goes for about 3 miles.

References

External links
 U.S. Geological Survey Map at the U.S. Geological Survey Map Website. Retrieved November 18th, 2022.

Trails
Geography of Cook County, Illinois